Arcobacter ebronensis is a species of bacteria first recovered from mussels, with type strain F128-2T (=CECT 8441T = LMG 27922T).

References

Further reading
Arguello, Esther, et al. "Bacteremia caused by Arcobacter butzleri in an immunocompromised host." Journal of Clinical Microbiology 53.4 (2015): 1448–1451.
Giacometti, Federica, et al. "Characterization of Arcobacter suis isolated from water buffalo (Bubalus bubalis) milk." Food microbiology 51 (2015): 186–191.

External links
LPSN

Campylobacterota
Bacteria described in 2015